is an action-adventure game developed by Nintendo and Intelligent Systems and published by Nintendo for the Super Nintendo Entertainment System in 1994. It is the third installment in the Metroid series, following the events of the Game Boy game Metroid II: Return of Samus (1991). Players control bounty hunter Samus Aran, who travels to planet Zebes to retrieve an infant Metroid creature stolen by the Space Pirate leader Ridley.

Following the established gameplay model of its predecessors, Super Metroid focuses on exploration, with the player searching for power-ups used to reach previously inaccessible areas. It introduced new concepts to the series, such as the inventory screen, an automap, and the ability to fire in all directions. The development staff from previous Metroid games—including Yoshio Sakamoto, Makoto Kano and Gunpei Yokoi—returned to develop Super Metroid over the course of two years. The developers wanted to make a true action game, and set the stage for Samus's reappearance.

Super Metroid received acclaim, with praise for its atmosphere, gameplay, music and graphics. It is often cited as one of the greatest video games of all time. The game sold well and shipped 1.42 million copies worldwide by late 2003. Alongside Castlevania: Symphony of the Night, Super Metroid is credited for establishing the "Metroidvania" genre, inspiring numerous indie games and developers. It also became popular among players for speedrunning. Super Metroid was followed in 2002 by Metroid Fusion and Metroid Prime. It has been re-released on several Nintendo consoles and services.

Gameplay

Super Metroid is a 2D side-scrolling action-adventure game, which primarily takes place on the fictional planet Zebes from the original game—a large, open-ended world with areas connected by doors and elevators. The player controls Samus Aran as she searches the planet for a Metroid that has been stolen by Ridley, the leader of the Space Pirates. Samus can run, jump, crouch, and fire a weapon in eight directions; she can also perform other actions, such as wall jumping—jumping from one wall to another in rapid succession to reach higher areas. The "Moon Walk" ability, named after the popular dance move of the same name, allows Samus to walk backwards while firing or charging her weapon.

Throughout the course of the game, the player can acquire power-ups that enhance Samus's armor and weaponry, as well as grant her special abilities, allowing them to gain access to areas that were previously inaccessible. The Morphing Ball allows Samus to curl into a ball and roll into tight places; while in this form, she can plant bombs once a Bomb power-up is acquired.  The Spring Ball adds the ability to jump while in Morphing Ball form. The Speed Booster can be used to run at high speeds and crash into barriers and enemies. The Hi-Jump Boots allow for a higher jump, and the Space Jump allows Samus to jump in midair. The Grapple Beam can be used to swing across open areas. The X-ray Scope is used to see items and passages through hidden walls and other surfaces.

The heads-up display shows Samus's health, the supply mode for Reserve Tanks, icons that represent weapons, and a map display showing her location and its surroundings. The inventory screen allows the player to enable and disable weapons and abilities. While the beam weapons can be combined, the Spazer and Plasma beams cannot be used simultaneously. At the game's end, Samus obtains the Hyper Beam, a powerful weapon generated by the energy given to her by the "super Metroid", the matured version of the larval creature that she seeks over the course of the game.  The backup units called Reserve Tanks can be used automatically when Samus's health is depleted. The game also features an automap to help players navigate the different areas of the game. Additionally, the player can use the map computer found in each part of the planet to reveal unexplored areas. To save their progress, the player must find and use one of the save stations scattered around the planet. The game can also be saved at Samus's gunship, which fully recharges her health and ammunition as well. Super Metroid has three endings based on the time taken to complete the game, which determine whether Samus poses with or without her suit. The best ending is achieved when the game is completed under three hours.  Additionally, an optional task alters the game's end slightly.  If the player chooses to rescue the Dachora and the Etecoons, friendly creatures encountered by Samus in the game, they are shown leaving the planet in the distance.

Plot

Samus Aran brings the last Metroid to the Ceres space colony for scientific study. Investigation of the specimen, a larva, reveals that its energy-producing abilities could actually be harnessed for the good of civilization. Shortly after leaving, Samus receives a distress call alerting her to return to the colony immediately. She finds the scientists dead, and the Metroid larva stolen by Ridley, leader of the Space Pirates. Samus escapes from the colony during a self-destruct sequence and follows Ridley to the planet Zebes. She searches the planet for the Metroid and finds that the Pirates have rebuilt their base there.

After defeating four bosses including Ridley in various regions of Zebes, Samus enters Tourian, the heart of the Pirates' base, and fights several Metroids that have somehow reproduced. A single Metroid that has grown to enormous size attacks and nearly destroys Samus, but relents at the last moment. It is the larva that was stolen from Ceres; because Samus was present at its birth on SR388, the Metroid has imprinted on Samus, recognizing her as its "mother".

Samus fights Mother Brain, a biomechanical creature that controls the Zebes systems. Mother Brain overpowers Samus and again she is nearly killed, but the Metroid larva intervenes, attacking Mother Brain and healing Samus, confirming the scientists' findings. Mother Brain kills the Metroid, but upon death, it gives Samus the Hyper Beam, a powerful weapon strong enough to kill Mother Brain. Samus escapes Zebes as it self-destructs.

Development

Super Metroid was developed by Nintendo R&D1 with a staff of 15 managed by Gunpei Yokoi. It was written and directed by Yoshio Sakamoto, and produced by Makoto Kano. Intelligent Systems, who co-developed the original Metroid with R&D1, handled the programming. The opening was narrated by Dan Owsen, a Nintendo of America employee.

Super Metroid was released almost a decade after the original Metroid. Sakamoto said: "We wanted to wait until a true action game was needed. [...] And also to set the stage for the reappearance of Samus Aran." It took half a year for Nintendo to approve the project, and two further years to develop.

The developers' primary goal was to make a "good action game". It is the first Metroid game to let Samus fire in all directions while moving. It is also among the first open-world games with a map feature, which shows the outlines of rooms and indicates important locations and items. The team wanted to create a large map, but found it difficult to organize the amount of graphic data involved, and so broke it into smaller parts. Areas from previous Metroid games were included to create a sense of familiarity.

Shortly before the game's release, the North American Entertainment Software Rating Board, a self-regulating organization, was formed in response to the increasing violence in games such as Mortal Kombat (1992). Asked whether he thought the controversy would cause a backlash for Super Metroid, Sakamoto explained that Samus's purpose is to maintain peace in the galaxy, saying: "It's not violence for the sake of violence." The game was demonstrated at the Winter 1994 Consumer Electronics Show, and was named the best Super NES game at the show by GamePro.

Audio
The music for Super Metroid was composed by Kenji Yamamoto and Minako Hamano, and uses 16-bit versions of music from previous games. The Super NES's sound hardware allowed the playback of samples simultaneously on eight channels, as opposed to three PSG channels and one noise channel of the NES. Yamamoto decided that rich and expressive sounds, such as a female chorus, would be required to portray the setting realistically. He composed the main theme by humming while riding his motorcycle from work.

Yamamoto also served as a sound programmer, and wrote a program that sends sound data to the audio chip. He also created sound effects, including those created for an infant Metroid to convey different emotions. The simultaneous roles as a composer, a sound programmer and a sound effect creator gave Yamamoto ideas to produce a distinct Metroid soundtrack "with a sound programmer's ear, with a sound effect creator's ear, and with the approach methodology and theory of a composer." The arrangements and remixes of the game's themes were used in Metroid Prime and its sequels, because Yamamoto wanted to satisfy old Metroid fans, describing it as a "present" for them.

A soundtrack album, Super Metroid: Sound in Action, was published by Sony Records on June 22, 1994. It contains 38 tracks and has a running time of 58:49. It includes the original Metroid soundtrack by Hirokazu Tanaka, and additional tracks arranged by Yoshiyuki Ito and Masumi Ito.

Release
The game was released by Nintendo in Japan on March 19, 1994, in North America on April 18, and in Europe on July 28. It was distributed on a 24-megabit cartridge. It was re-released through the Nintendo Power service in Japan on September 30, 1997. Super Metroid became available as a Wii Virtual Console game in North America on August 20, 2007, in Japan on September 20, and in Europe on October 12. In Super Smash Bros. Brawl, it is also one of the trial games available in the "Masterpieces" section, which uses Virtual Console technology to emulate older hardware and have time constraints. The game was later released on the Wii U Virtual Console in May 2013, initially available during the trial campaign for a cheaper price before reverting to its regular price the next month. The New Nintendo 3DS-specific Virtual Console also received the release in April 2016.  In September 2017, Nintendo released the Super NES Classic Edition, which included Super Metroid among its games. Super Metroid and other Super NES games were added to the Nintendo Switch Online subscription service in September 2019.

Reception

Super Metroid was met with critical acclaim. Chris Slate of the Game Players video game magazine thoroughly enjoyed Super Metroid, claiming that it "easily lives up to everyone's high expectations". He was satisfied with how Nintendo mixed complex gameplay with "state-of-the-art" graphics and sound. Slate found the newly added auto-mapping feature something that players really needed, saying that it was the only feature in Super Metroid that the original Metroid should have had. Concluding his review, Slate stated, "Action fans can't afford to miss Super Metroid. [...] You'll want to play through again and again even after you've beaten it." Nintendo Power mentioned that the game "may well be the best action adventure game ever", calling it the "wave of the future". They praised the game's graphics, sound, and controls, while their only negative comment was, "Even 100 megabits of Metroid wouldn't be enough." Electronic Gaming Monthly gave Super Metroid their "Game of the Month" award, comparing it favorably to the original Metroid and applauding the graphics, the many weapons and items available, and the music. Each of the four reviewers gave it scores of nine out of ten. GamePro criticized that the controls are often awkward or difficult and that many of the power-ups are either lifted from other Super NES games or simple upgrades of other power-ups in the game, but praised the game's massive size along with the auto-mapping feature, saying it "makes a potentially frustrating game accessible to a far wider audience." Andy Robinson of GamesRadar was pleased with the game's "phenomenal" soundtrack, complimenting it as "one of the best videogame scores of all time".

Super Play critic Zy Nicholson said that Super Metroid was better than his favorite game, Mega Man X, describing it as "more of an experience than a game". Comparing the game to the 1986 film Aliens, Nicholson felt that the game was best experienced in the dark with the volume turned up. He found the game so compulsive that he was tempted to play "without eating or sleeping". Super Play critic Tony Mott cited the atmosphere as its best aspect, and described the game as a mixture of Aliens, Turrican (1990),  Exile (1989), and Nodes of Yesod (1985). Appreciating the game's controls, Mott applauded the refined gameplay. He concluded his review by calling Super Metroid "undoubtedly the best game I've played this year so far", predicting that anyone who plays the game would be "playing a game destined for classic status". The third reviewer, James Leach, agreed with Nicholson and Mott that Super Metroid was what Mega Man X should have been. Concluding his review, Leach wrote that Super Metroid contained everything he looked for in a video game: "playability, hidden tricks, powerful weapons and steamingly evil baddies". Super Play's verdict was, "We all love this game. Super Metroid is absolutely marvelous and you should own it."

Edge criticized the graphics and short length, but praised Super Metroid as "intensely playable" and "full of memorable moments". IGN called Super Metroids Virtual Console version a "must-own", commenting that although the game was released nine months after the Wii launched, they felt that it was worth the wait. For players who have never played Super Metroid, IGN claims that they owe themselves as gamers to "finally find out about what you've been missing all these years". In his review for GameSpot, Frank Provo found it "absolutely astonishing that Nintendo let 13 years go by before making Super Metroid readily available again", but considered the most important thing was that players "can now play this masterpiece without having to track down the original Super Nintendo Entertainment System cartridge or fumble with legally questionable emulators". Despite admitting that the Virtual Console version was essentially "nothing more than a no-frills, emulated version of a 13-year-old SNES game" that was no longer cutting-edge, he was still pleased with it and reiterated his belief that Super Metroid is "one of the best 2D action adventure games ever produced".

Sales
In Japan, Super Metroid was the ninth-best-selling video game of 1994, with 531,000 copies sold that year. In North America, despite receiving critical acclaim, Rus McLaughlin of IGN said that the Metroid series "still fell down on the timing, arriving too late in the SNES lifecycle to earn big sales." Robinson similarly noted that, in a series tradition, the game was released "at the wrong place, at the wrong time." With the help of strong marketing from Nintendo, Super Metroid sold well in North America, topping the Super NES sales chart in May 1994. A year after its release, Nintendo placed it on their Player's Choice marketing label. By late 2003, the game had shipped 1.42 million copies worldwide.

Accolades
Super Metroid received several awards and honors. Electronic Gaming Monthly named Super Metroid a Game of the Month for May 1994, gave it an Editors' Choice award, awarded it as the Best Action Game of 1994, and named it the best game of all time in 2003. IGN ranked Super Metroid 3rd (2003), 10th (2005) and 7th (2007) in its top 100 games of all time lists. Likewise, IGN readers ranked the game 11th in its top 99 games of all-time list in 2005, and 4th in its top 100 games in 2006. Richard George of IGN also ranked Super Metroid 3rd in its top 100 SNES games, crediting its "flawless action, impeccable level design, out-of-this-world atmosphere, a totally badass heroine and an enormous overworld to explore." GamesRadar named Super Metroid the best SNES game of all time, while Nintendo Power named it the best game in the Metroid series, beating out Metroid Prime and Metroid: Zero Mission. GamePro listed Super Metroid as one of the fifteen must-play retro games on the Wii. Game Informer placed the game 29th on their top 100 games of all time in 2001. In 2018, Complex listed the game 3rd on their "The Best Super Nintendo Games of All Time."  They opined that Super Metroid is "tour de force from Nintendo" and described the gameplay as perfect. In 1995, Total! rated the game 17th on its "Top 100 SNES Games." In 1995, Flux magazine listed Super Metroid 62nd in their Top 100 Video Games.  They praised the game for its challenging gameplay and haunting atmosphere, although they felt that it is too similar to its predecessor.

Legacy
Super Metroid is often regarded as one of the greatest video games of all time. Jeremy Parish of USgamer remarked that Super Metroid is a "kind of game you can return to time and again and always come away with some fresh insight or observation." Andrew Webster of Ars Technica found the game's atmosphere impressive, and noted that the developers had perfected the aspect on solitude, a concept introduced in the first Metroid game. Game Informer writer Joe Juba cited the game's ending as "one of the most memorable and empowering moments in gaming history." In 2009, Official Nintendo Magazine called the game "Challenging, deep and undeniably epic", placing it 24th on a list of the greatest Nintendo games.

As Super Metroid gave players awards based on how quick it took them to complete the game, it has become a popular choice for speedrunning, a style of play in which the player intends to complete the game as quickly as possible for the purpose of competition. Super Metroid, alongside Konami's 1997 game Castlevania: Symphony of the Night, is also credited for establishing the "Metroidvania" genre. It was cited as an influence on other Metroidvania games, including Shadow Complex and Axiom Verge.

Several ROM hacks for Super Metroid were released by fans, which added new features that are not included in the original game. Super Metroid: Redesign, created by "drewseph" in 2006, features new items, expanded areas and modified physics. In 2011, a Japanese hacker named "SB" released a ROM hack titled Metroid: Super Zero Mission, which intends to combine elements from Super Metroid and Metroid: Zero Mission.

Sequels
Nintendo did not release another Metroid game for eight years, as the series did not match the success of the Mario and Legend of Zelda franchises. Yokoi left Nintendo in August 1996, amid the failure of the Virtual Boy, and died in a car accident in October 1997.

Fans eagerly awaited a Metroid game for the Nintendo 64 (N64). According to Nintendo producer Shigeru Miyamoto, Nintendo did not develop a Metroid game for the N64 as they "couldn't come out with any concrete ideas". Sakamoto said he could not imagine how the N64 controller could be used to control Samus. Nintendo approached another company to make an N64 Metroid, but the offer was declined because the developers thought they could not make a game to equal Super Metroid.

In late 2002, Nintendo released Metroid Fusion, a 2D game developed for the Game Boy Advance by Nintendo R&D1, and Metroid Prime, a first-person game developed for the GameCube by the American company Retro Studios, and the first Metroid game to use 3D graphics. Both Fusion and Prime garnered acclaim, with Prime winning several Game of the Year awards. After Metroid Prime, three more games in the first-person perspective and a pinball spin-off were released, including its sequel, Metroid Prime 2: Echoes (2004).

References

Notes

Citations

External links 
 Official Nintendo Japan Super Metroid website 
 

1994 video games
Action-adventure games
Extinction in fiction
Intelligent Systems games
Metroid games
Metroidvania games
New Nintendo 3DS games
Nintendo Research & Development 1 games
Nintendo Switch Online games
Open-world video games
Single-player video games
Super Nintendo Entertainment System games
Video games about genetic engineering
Video games developed in Japan
Video games featuring female protagonists
Video games scored by Kenji Yamamoto (composer, born 1964)
Video games set on fictional planets
Video games set in outer space
Virtual Console games
Virtual Console games for Wii U
Virtual Console games for Nintendo 3DS